Jornalista Benedito Pimentel–Ourinhos Airport  is the airport serving Ourinhos, Brazil.

It is operated by the Municipality of Ourinhos.

History
On February 16, 2018 the management of the airport was transferred to the Municipality of Ourinhos. Previously it was administrated by DAESP.

Airlines and destinations
No scheduled flights operate at this airport.

Access

See also

List of airports in Brazil

References

External links

Airports in São Paulo (state)